The Treaty of London (1913) was signed on 30 May following the London Conference of 1912–1913. It dealt with the territorial adjustments arising out of the conclusion of the First Balkan War. The London Conference had ended on 23 January 1913, when the 1913 Ottoman coup d'état took place and Ottoman Grand Vizier Kâmil Pasha was forced to resign. Coup leader Enver Pasha withdrew the Ottoman Empire from the Conference, and the Treaty of London was signed without the presence of the Ottoman delegation.

Combatants
The combatants were the victorious Balkan League (Serbia, Greece, Bulgaria, and Montenegro) and the defeated Ottoman Empire.  Representing the Great Powers were the United Kingdom, Germany, Russia, Austria-Hungary, and Italy.

History

Hostilities had officially ceased on 2 December 1912, except for Greece that had not participated in the first truce.  Three principal points were in dispute:
 the status of the territory of present-day Albania, the vast majority of which had been conquered especially by Serbia, but also small regions by Montenegro, and Greece
 the status of the Sanjak of Novi Pazar formally under the protection of Austria-Hungary since the Treaty of Berlin in 1878
 the status of the other territories taken by the Allies: Kosovo; Macedonia; and Thrace

The Treaty was negotiated in London at an international conference which had opened there in December 1912, following the declaration of independence by Albania on 28 November 1912.

Austria-Hungary and Italy strongly supported the creation of an independent Albania.  In part, this was consistent with Austria-Hungary's previous policy of resisting Serb expansion to the Adriatic; Italy had designs on the territory, manifested in 1939.  Russia supported Serbia and Montenegro. Germany and Britain remained neutral. The balance of power struck between the members of the Balkan League had been on the assumption that no Albanian polity would be formed and the later Albanian territory would be split between them.

Terms

The terms enforced by the Great Powers were:
 All European territory of the Ottoman Empire west of the line between Enos on the Aegean Sea and Midia on the Black Sea was ceded to the Balkan League, except Albania.
 His Majesty the Emperor of the Ottomans declares that he cedes to their Majesties the Allied Sovereigns the island of Crete and that he renounces in their favour all rights of sovereignty and all other rights which he possessed in that island.
 The borders of Albania and all other questions concerning Albania were to be settled by the Great Powers.

However, the division of the territories ceded to the Balkan League was not addressed in the Treaty, and Serbia refused to carry out the division agreed with Bulgaria in their treaty of March 1912. As a result of Bulgarian dissatisfaction with the de facto military division of Macedonia, the Second Balkan War broke out between the combatants on 16 June 1913. The Bulgarians were defeated, and the Ottomans made some gains west of the Enos-Midia line. A final peace was agreed at the Treaty of Bucharest on 12 August 1913. A separate treaty, the Treaty of Constantinople, was concluded between the Bulgarians and Turks, largely defining the modern-day borders between the two countries.

Perceptions
The delineation of the exact boundaries of the Albanian state under the Protocol of Florence (17 December 1913) was highly unpopular among the Greek population of southern Albania, who after their revolt managed to declare the Autonomous Republic of Northern Epirus, was internationally recognised as an autonomous region inside Albania under the terms of the Protocol of Corfu.

Albanians have tended to regard the Treaty as an injustice imposed by the Great Powers, as roughly half of the predominantly Albanian territories and 40% of the population were left outside the new country's borders.

See also
 Treaties of London

References

Further reading
 Anderson, M.S. The Eastern Question, 1774-1923: A Study in International Relations (1966) online

External links

 Chronology of the 1913 London Peace Conference

1913 in Austria-Hungary
1913 in Europe
1913 in the Ottoman Empire
1913 in London
First Balkan War
Modern history of Albania
Peace treaties of Bulgaria
Peace treaties of Serbia
Treaties concluded in 1913
London (1913)
London (1913)
Treaties of the Kingdom of Bulgaria
London (1913)
Treaties of the Kingdom of Montenegro
Treaties of the Kingdom of Serbia
London (1913)
London (1913)
Treaties of the Kingdom of Greece
Peace treaties of Greece
May 1913 events
1910s in the City of Westminster
London